Ailean is a masculine given name in the Scottish Gaelic language. It is the Scottish Gaelic equivalent of the name Alan, Allan in English. Alan is considered to be a name of Celtic origin, possibility derived from a word meaning "rock"; it was introduced to England by Breton followers of William the Conqueror, in the 11th century.

List of people with the given name
Ailean Maclean, (fl. 16th century), a Scotsman popularised in 19th century folklore
Ailéan mac Ruaidhrí, (died ×1296), Norwegian and Scottish magnate

References

Scottish Gaelic masculine given names
Scottish given names